More Than Just Parks is an organization and film project with the goal of encouraging the exploration and conservation of national parks through short films. The project was founded by filmmakers and brothers Jim Pattiz and Will Pattiz from Georgia. The brothers use a combination of time lapse photography and video to create their films, which have received critical acclaim. The project has thus far resulted in short films on 10 national parks, with an aim of filming all 59 US national parks. The Pattiz brothers frequently appear on The Weather Channel's morning programs Weekend Recharge and AMHQ to share insight from different national parks.

History
After being wowed by Arizona’s Petrified Forest national park in 2012, the Pattiz brothers set out to produce free documentaries on all 59 national parks in the U.S. The project's first film was completed in the summer of 2014 and showcased the beauty of Olympic National Park. Since then the Pattiz brothers have completed films on various other national parks, and in 2016 brought worldwide fame to little known Voyageurs National Park in northern Minnesota.

Style
More Than Just Parks uses a combination of time lapse photography and more traditional videography to make its short films. With only music accompanying the scenery, the films have a unique style Outside Magazine has called "straight-up nature porn".

Films

Released

References

2014 establishments in the United States
Parks